The Snoqualmie people (Lushootseed: sdukʷalbixʷ) are a southern Coast Salish indigenous people of the Pacific Northwest Coast. Their homelands span the Snoqualmie Valley in east King and Snohomish counties in Washington state.

Today, they are enrolled in the federally recognized tribes: Snoqualmie Indian Tribe and Tulalip Tribes of Washington.

Name
The Snoqualmie are also known as the Snoqualmu, Snoqualmoo, Snoqualmick, Snoqualamuke, or Snuqualmi. Their autonym in Lushootseed is sdukʷalbixʷ, meaning "people of the moon."

Language
Snoqualmie is a dialect of the Southern Puget Sound Salish language, which is a Lushootseed language, belonging to the Central Salish language family. Speakers of the dialect have been shifting their ancestral language towards English.

History
Snoqualmie people lived in 58 longhouses in sixteen villages, with a population of 3,000–4,000. In the mid-19th century, their homelands had four districts near modern Monroe, Tolt, Fall City, and North Bend. They had an influential leader, Chief Patkanin.

Some Snoqualmies settled onto the Tulalip Reservation after signing the Point Elliott Treaty with the Washington Territory in 1855, but many remained in their ancestral homelands around the Snoqualmie Valley and Lake Sammamish. At that time they were one of the largest tribes in the Puget Sound region, numbering around 4,000.

In 1916, the Snoqualmie people changed their political system to one based on majority rule. They developed four councils: the General Council of the People, the Council of Elders, the Representative Tribal Council, and the Council of Chiefs. Jerry Kanim, nephew of Chief Patkanin was named the new chief after the political reorganization took place. Kanim was not replaced as chief until 1986, 30 years after his death.

They have tried and failed on several occasions to secure a reservation on their ancestral lands along the Tolt River (a tributary of the Snoqualmie River). Instead, they purchased land for and were granted a Reservation near Snoqualmie, Washington, on which the tribe opened the Snoqualmie Casino in 2008.

Notes

References
 Pritzker, Barry M. A Native American Encyclopedia: History, Culture, and Peoples. Oxford: Oxford University Press, 2000. .

Further reading
 Tweddell, Colin E. The Snoqualmie-Duwamish Dialects of Puget Sound Coast Salish: An Outline of Phonemics and Morphology. University of Washington publications in anthropology, v. 12. Seattle: University of Washington Press, 1950.

External links 
Washington state Office of Indian Affairs - Tribal Directory
Snoqualmie Tribe Information

Native American tribes in Washington (state)
Coast Salish